LendKey (formerly Fynanz Inc.) is a lending platform and online marketplace that allows consumers to apply for and receive private student loans, student loan refinancing and home improvement loans from their local credit unions and community banks. LendKey's cloud-based tools and infrastructure enable the nation's 13,000+ community financial institutions to enter online lending and offer loans for various asset classes.

Overview

LendKey was founded in 2007 and was originally called Fynanz. As Fynanz, the company operated as a peer-to-peer loan platform for student loans, and distinguished itself from other P2P lenders by guaranteeing loans, and by using new data sources to assess the creditworthiness of applicants. In 2013 the company rebranded under the new LendKey name, and took its lending platform to credit unions and community banks.

In January 2010, LendKey received $9.5 million in venture funding during its Series A round of financing. Subsequently, the company secured another $12.5 million in venture funding in August 2013, bringing the total capital raised by the company to $22 million. Series B funding was led by investors Updata Partners and TTV Capital, as well as existing investors Draper Fisher Jurvetson and Gotham Ventures.

As of September 2014, LendKey has over 300 credit union clients with a combined loan portfolio of over $700 million, services more than 30,000 borrowers nationwide, and is sponsored by 28 state trade associations. In 2014 LendKey, which is headquartered in New York, opened a new office in the Cincinnati area.  As of 2018 it claimed more than $2 Billion in loan originations.

External links

References

Financial services companies established in 2007
Companies based in New York City
Financial services companies based in New York City
Loans